The 2015–16 Algerian Women's Championship is the eighteenth season of the Algerian Women's Championship, the Algerian national women's association football competition. Afak Relizane won the championship for the seventh time.

Clubs

Stadia and locations

Results

Groups

Group Centre-East

Group Centre-West

Play down

Play off

References

External links
2015–16 Algerian Women's Championship - goalzz.com

Algerian Women's Championship seasons